Flood risk management (FRM) aims to reduce the human and socio-economic losses caused by flooding and is part of the larger field of risk management. Flood risk management analyzes the relationships between physical systems and socio-economic environments through flood risk assessment and tries to create understanding and action about the risks posed by flooding. The relationships cover a wide range of topics, from drivers and natural processes, to models and socio-economic consequences. 

This relationship examines management methods which includes a wide range of flood management methods including but are not limited to flood mapping and physical implication measures. FRM looks at how to reduce flood risk and how to appropriately manage risks that are associated with flooding. Flood risk management includes mitigating and preparing for flooding disasters, analyzing risk, and providing a risk analysis system to mitigate the negative impacts caused by flooding.

Flooding and flood risk are especially important with more extreme weather and sea level rise caused by climate change as more areas will be effected by flood risk.



Flood risk 

There have been numerous flood incidents around the world which have caused devastating damage to infrastructure, the natural environment and human life. Flood risks can be defined as the risk that floods pose to individuals, property and the natural landscape based on specific hazards and vulnerability. The extent of flood risks can impact the types of mitigation strategies required and implemented.

Floods can have devastating impacts to human societies. Flooding events worldwide are increasing in frequency and severity, leading to increasing costs to societies. Economical, social and natural environmental damages are common factors that are impacted by flooding events and the impacts that flooding has on these areas can be catastrophic.

As mentioned, the economic impacts caused by flooding can be severe. A large amount of the world’s population lives in close proximity to major coastlines, while many major cities and agricultural areas are located near floodplains. There is significant risk for increased coastal and fluvial flooding due to changing climatic conditions. Every year flooding causes countries billions of dollars worth of damage that threatens the livelihood of individuals. As a result, there is also significant socio-economic threats to vulnerable populations around the world from flooding.

Management methods 
Flood risk management methods help reduce the risk of human and socio-economic losses caused by flooding and spans many different disciplines.  Management of the risks associated with flooding can decrease the costs incurred by governmental bodies, marginalized communities, individuals, and property.

Flood risk management strategy diversification is needed to ensure that management strategies cover several different scenarios and ensure best practices. The diversification of flood risk management baseline framework can be used to help guide governing bodies to make decisions based on expert advice, and based on common terms to ensure that strategies can be understood across multiple disciplines.

Flood risk management helps to decrease the negative economic, social, and physical consequences of flooding events. FRM involves several steps and it can occur prior, during, or after flooding events. FRM examines five stages; how to prevent floods, best defenses against flooding, bet way to mitigate the negative consequences of flooding, how to prepare for flooding events, and how to recover after a flooding event. By examining these five different factors, governing agencies are able to evaluate risk management at different stages of flooding events.

Flood Mapping 
Flood mapping is a tool used by governments and policy makers to delineate the borders of potential flooding events, allowing educated decisions to prevent extreme flooding events. Flood maps are useful to create documentation that allows policy makers to make informed decisions about flood hazards. Flood mapping also provides conceptual models to both the public and private sectors with information about flooding hazards. Flood mapping has been criticized in many areas around the world, due to the absence of public accessibility, technical writing and data, and lack of easy-to-understand information. However, revived attention towards flood mapping has renewed the interest in enhancing current flood mapping for use as a flood risk management method.

Flood modelling 
Flood modelling is a tool used to model flood hazard and the effects on humans and the physical environment. Flood modelling takes into consideration how flood hazards, external and internal processes and factors, and the main drivers of floods interact with each other. Flood modelling combines factors such as terrain, hydrology, and urban topography to reproduce the evolution of a flood in order to identify the different levels of flooding risks associated with each element exposed. The modelling can be carried out using hydraulic models, conceptual models, or geomorphic methods. Nowadays, there is a growing attention also in the production of maps obtained with remote sensing. Flood modelling is helpful for determining building development practices and hazard mitigation methods that reduce the risks associated with flooding.

Stakeholder Engagement 
Stakeholder engagement is a useful tool for flood risk management that allows enhanced public engagement for agreements to be reached on policy discussions. Different management considerations can be taken into account including emergency management and disaster risk reduction goals, interactions of land-use planning with the integration of flood risks and required policies. In flood management, stakeholder engagement is seen as an important way to achieve greater cohesion and consensus. Integrating stakeholder engagement into flood management often provides a more complex analysis of the situation; this generally adds more demand in determining collective solutions and increases the time it takes to determine solutions.

Implementation Measures 

Flood risk management includes implementation of flood mitigation measures to reduce the physical impacts of floods. These measures can exist as precautionary measures based on an assessment of flood risk, as measures that are implemented prior and during flooding events, or as measures implemented after a flooding event.

Precautionary measures include the implementation of flood water barriers, installing protective and/ or resilient technologies and materials in properties that are prone to flooding, regulations for building in flood prone areas, flood warning systems, etc. 

Measures such as the implementation of dikes were constructed in the Netherlands following extreme flooding risk due to the country's low-lying landscapes. Other flood risk management strategies include flood-proof buildings, increased water storage capacity in reservoirs, and the construction of dams and embankments. Flood mitigation methods can also involve policy that reduces the amount of urban structures built around floodplains. This policy helps to reduce the amount of mitigation needed to protect humans and buildings from flooding events.  Following the occurrence of flooding events, implementation measures such as rebuilding plans, and insurance can be structured into flood risk management plans.

See also 
 Flood risk assessment
 Flood control
 Floodplain
 River valley civilization
Floods in the Netherlands
Hydrology
Geomorphology
List of Floods
Flood alert
Flood stage
Erosion

References

Flood control